Herma Meijer (born 16 April 1969) is a retired speed skater from the Netherlands who was active between 1987 and 1993. She competed at the 1992 Winter Olympics in the 500 and 1000 m and finished in 11th and 12th place, respectively. She won two national titles, in the 500 m (1989) and 1500 m (1990). 

Personal bests: 
500 m – 40.53 (1989)
 1000 m – 1:22.88 (1989)
 1500 m – 2:05.98 (1990)
 3000 m – 4:27.62 (1990)
 5000 m – 7:37.65 (1990)

References

1969 births
Living people
Dutch female speed skaters
Olympic speed skaters of the Netherlands
Speed skaters at the 1992 Winter Olympics
People from Assen
20th-century Dutch women
21st-century Dutch women
Sportspeople from Drenthe